The 1964 Clemson Tigers football team was an American football team that represented Clemson University in the Atlantic Coast Conference (ACC) during the 1964 NCAA University Division football season. In its 25th season under head coach Frank Howard, the team compiled a 3–7 record (2–4 against conference opponents), finished seventh in the ACC, and was outscored by a total of 135 to 105. The team played its home games at Memorial Stadium in Clemson, South Carolina.

John Boyett and Ted Bunton were the team captains. The team's statistical leaders included Thomas Ray with 253 passing yards, Hal Davis with 533 rushing yards and 30 points scored (5 touchdowns), and Hoss Hostetler with 103 receiving yards.

Schedule

References

Clemson
Clemson Tigers football seasons
Clemson Tigers football